(Document translated and modified from Italian Wikipedia page)

The family Syrphidae consists of more than 6000 living species of hoverfly. The internal taxonomy of the family and the number of genera varies greatly between sources leading to considerable discrepancy across the literature.  This is currently in the process of reorganization on the basis of phylogenetic studies but knowledge is still incomplete, especially in light of recent studies of larval characters suggesting relationships which don't correspond with the phylogeny based solely on adult characters. 

The current classification is therefore still based on the morphology of adults and basically refers to the taxonomic scheme adopted by Thompson & Rotheray in the Manual of Palaearctic Diptera (1998), which divides the family into three subfamilies and fourteen tribes. 

The nomenclature given here is derived partly from the BioSystematic Database of World Diptera (BDWD), and a working classification created by a group of molecular biologists which no doubt will alter greatly in the future. 

The distribution of genera in biogeographic realms is derived from the biosystematics BDWD.

Legend
AF: Afrotropical realm
AU: Australasian realm
NE: Nearctic realm
NT: Neotropical realm
OR: Oriental realm
PA: Palearctic realm

Eristalinae
The subfamily Eristalinae (=Milesiinae) is subdivided into 9 tribes.

Tribe: Brachyopini
(=Chrysogasterini Shannon, 1922)

Subtribe: Brachyopina
Brachyopa (=Eugeniamyia): NE OR PA
 Subgenera:
B. (Brachyopa) Meigen, 1822
B. (Hammerschmidtia) Schummel, 1834
B. (Trichobrachyopa) Kassebeer, 2001
Cacoceria Hull, 1936: NTChromocheilosia Hull & Fluke, 1950: NTChrysogaster Meigen, 1803 (=Ighboulomyia): AF NE PAChrysosyrphus Sedman, 1965: NE PACyphipelta Bigot, 1859: AUHemilampra Macquart, 1850: AULejogaster Rondani, 1857: PALepidomyia Loew, 1864 (=Lepidostola): NE NTLiochrysogaster Stackelberg, 1924: PAMelanogaster Rondani, 1857Myolepta (=Eumyolepta, Sarolepta, Xylotaeja) : AF NE NT OR PA
 Subgenera:
 M. (Myolepta) Loew, 1864
 M. (Protolepidostola) Hull, 1949d : NTNeoplesia  Macquart, 1850Orthonevra Macquart, 1829: NE NT OR PARiponnensia Maibach, Goeldlin & Speight, 1994

Subtribe: SphegininaAustroascia Thompson & Marnef, 1977: NTChamaesphegina Shannon & Aubertin, 1922 (=Desmetrum): NTNeoascia (=Stenopipiza): NE OR PA
 Subgenera:N. (Neoascia) Williston, 1887N. (Neoasciella) Stackelberg, 1965Sphegina : NE OR PA
 Subgenera:
 S. (Sphegina) Meigen, 1822
 S. (Asiosphegina) Stackelberg, 1975

Tribe: Callicerini
(=Calliceratinae Brues & Melander, 1932)Callicera Panzer, 1809: NE NT OR PANotiocheilosia Thompson, 1972: NT

Tribe: Cerioidini

(=Ceriini, Cerioidinae Wahlgren, 1909)Ceriana (=Ceria, Ceriathrix, Cerioides, Hisamatsumyia, Shambalia, Tenthredomyia)
 Subgenera:C. (Ceriana) Rafinesque, 1815C. (Monoceromyia) Shannon, 1925C. (Polybiomyia) Shannon, 1925C. (Sphiximorpha) Rondani, 1850Primocerioides Shannon, 1927: PA

Tribe: Eristalini

Subtribe: EristalinaAustalis Thompson & Vockeroth, 2003: AUAxona Walker, 1864: AU ORDigulia Meijere, 1913: AUDissoptera Edwards, 1915 (=Xenozoon): AU OREristalinus (=Metalloeristalis, Oreristalis): cosmopolitan
 Subgenera:E. (Eristalinus) Rondani, 1845E. (Eristalodes) Mik, 1897E. (Helophilina) Becker, 1922E. (Lathyrophthalmus) Mik, 1897E. (Merodonoides) Curran, 1931Eristalis (=Cristalis, Elophilus, Eristaloides, Eristalomya, Eristalomyia, Eriops, Tubifera): cosmopolitan
 Subgenera:E. (Eoseristalis) Kanervo, 1938E. (Eristalis) Latreille, 1804Keda Curran, 1931: AU ORKertesziomyia (=Catacores, Kertesziomya, Klossia, Paramesembrius): AU OR PA
 Subgenera:K. (Kertesziomyia) Shiraki, 1930K. (Pseuderistalis) Shiraki, 1930Lycastrirhyncha Bigot, 1859: NTMeromacroides Curran, 1927: AFMeromacrus Rondani, 1849 (=Metameromacrus, Plagiocera, Promilesia, Pteroptila, Thalamopales): NTPalpada (=Doliosyrphus): NE NT
 Subgenera:P. (Gymnopalpada) Vockeroth, 1981P. (Palpada) Macquart, 1834P. (Trichopalpada) Vockeroth, 1981Phytomia (=Megaspis, Streblia): AF AU OR PA
 Subgenera:P. (Dolichomerus) Macquart, 1850P. (Phytomia) Guerin-Meneville, 1833Senaspis Macquart, 1850 (=Protylocera, Triatylosus): AFSimoides Loew, 1858: AFSolenaspis Osten Sacken, 1881: AU OR

Subtribe: HelophilinaAustrophilus Thompson, 2000: AUChasmomma Bezzi, 1915: AFDolichogyna : NT
 Subgenera:D. (Dolichogyna) Macquart, 1842D. (Nosodepus) Speiser, 1913Habromyia Williston, 1888 (=Edwardsietta): NTHelophilus (=Kirimyia): AU NE PA
 Subgenera:H. (Helophilus) Meigen, 1822H. (Pilinasica).Lejops (=Eurinomyia): AF NE PA
 Subgenera:L. (Anasimyia) Schiner, 1864L. (Arctosyrphus) Frey, 1918L. (Asemosyrphus) Bigot, 1882L. (Eurimyia) Bigot, 1883L. (Lejops) Rondani, 1857L. (Lunomyia) Curran & Fluke, 1926L. (Polydontomyia) Williston, 1896Mallota (=Imatisma, Paramallota, Trigridemyia): AF NE NT OR PA
 Subgenera:M. (Mallota) Meigen, 1822M. (Myathropa) Linnaeus, 1758Mesembrius (=Prionotomyia, Tityusia): AF AU OR PA
 Subgenera:M. (Mesembrius) Rondani, 1857M. (Vadonimyia) Séguy, 1951Ohmyia Thompson, 1999: NTParhelophilus Girschner, 1897 (=Pleskeola): NE PAQuichuana Knab, 1913: NT

Tribe: Sericomyiini

- sometimes regarded as a subtribe of the EristaliniPararctophila Herve-Bazin, 1914: OR PAPseudovolucella Shiraki, 1930: OR PAPyritis Hunter, 1897: NESericomyia (=Cinxia, Condidea, Tapetomyia)
 Subgenera:S. (Arctophila) Schiner, 1860S. (Conosyrphus) Frey, 1915S. (Sericomyia) Meigen, 1803

Tribe: Eumerini
(=Merodontini, Medorontinae Edwards, 1915, Medorontinae Bezzi, 1915, Medorontidae Glumac & Vujic, 1990, Nausigasterinae Shannon, 1921)Alipumilio Shannon, 1927: NTAustrocheilosia Thompson, 2008: AUAzpeytia Walker, 1865: AU OR PACepa Thompson & Vockeroth, 2007 (=Xela Thompson, 1999)Eumerus Meigen, 1822 (=Amphoterus, Citibaena, Paragopsis): cosmopolitanLyneborgimyia Doczkal & Pape, 2009Megatrigon Johnson, 1898Merodon Meigen, 1803 (=Lampetia): AF AU NE OR PA
 Subgenera:M. (Exmerodon) Becker, 1912M. (Merodon) Meigen, 1803Nausigaster Shannon, 1921Platynochaetus Wiedemann, 1830Psilota Meigen, 1822 (=Emmyia): AU NE OR PA
 Subgenera:P. (Psilota) Meigen, 1822P. (Psilotanycus)Tribe: Milesiini
(=Xylotini)

Subtribe: BlerinaBlera Billberg, 1820 (=Cynorhina): NE OR PACaliprobola Rondani, 1845: PACynorhinella Curran, 1922: NELejota Rondani, 1857 (=Chalcomyia): NE PAPhilippimyia Shannon, 1926: NTSomula Macquart, 1847: NE

Subtribe: CriorhininaCriorhina Meigen, 1822 (=Brachymyia, Eurhinomallota, Romaleosyrphus): NE NT OR PADeineches Walker, 1852: AUFlukea Etcheverry, 1966: NTLycastris Walker, 1857: ORMalometasternum Shannon, 1927: AUMatsumyia Shiraki, 1949: OR PAPseudopocota Mutin & Barkalov, 1995: PASphecomyia Latreille, 1829 (=Tyzenhauzia): NE PA

Subtribe: MilesiinaHemixylota Shannon & Aubertin, 1933: NTMilesia Latreille, 1804 (=Pogonosyrphus, Sphixea): cosmopolitanSpilomyia Meigen, 1803: NE NT OR PAStilbosoma Philippi, 1865: NTSyrittosyrphus Hull, 1944: AF

Subtribe: TemnostominaAneriophora Stuardo & Cortes, 1952: NTOdyneromyia : AU NT
 Subgenera:O. (Odyneromyia) Shannon & Aubertin, 1833O. (Austroxylota)Palumbia (=Priomerus): NE OR PA
 Subgenera:P. (Korinchia) Edwards, 1919P. (Palumbia) Rondani, 1865Pterallastes Loew, 1863 (=Pseudozetterstedtia): NE PATakaomyia Herve-Bazin, 1914 (=Vespiomyia): OR PATemnostoma Lepeletier & Serville, 1828: NE OR PATeuchocnemis Osten Sacken, 1875: NEValdiviomyia Vockeroth, 1976 (=Valdivia): NT

Subtribe: TropidiinaCalcaretropidia Keiser, 1971: AF AU ORMacrozelima Stackelberg, 1930: OR PAMeropidia Hippa & Thompson, 1983: NTNepenthosyrphus Meijere, 1932: OROrthoprosopa : AU
 Subgenera:O. (Orthoprosopa) Macquart, 1850O. (Paratropidia) Hull, 1949Senogaster Macquart, 1834: NTSyritta Lepeletier & Serville, 1828: cosmopolitanTropidia : NE NT PA
 Subgenera:T. (Ortholophus)T. (Tropidia)  Meigen, 1822

Subtribe: XylotinaBrachypalpus : NE PA
 Subgenera:B. (Brachypalpus) Macquart, 1834B. (Crioprora) Osten Sacken, 1878Cacoceria Hull, 1936 (=Cacomyia): NTChalcosyrphus : NE OR PA
 Subgenera:C. (Chalcosyrphus) Curran, 1925C. (Cheiroxylota) Hull, 1949C. (Dimorphoxylota) Hippa, 1978C. (Hardimyia) Ferguson, 1926C. (Neplas) Porter, 1927C. (Neploneura) Hippa, 1978C. (Spheginoides) Szilady, 1939C. (Syrittoxylota) Hippa, 1978C. (Xylotina) Hippa, 1978C. (Xylotodes) Shannon, 1926C. (Xylotomima) Shannon, 1926Hadromyia : NE PA
 Subgenera:H. (Chrysosomidia) Curran, 1934H. (Hadromyia) Williston, 1882Macrometopia Philippi, 1865: NTPocota Lepeletier & Serville, 1828: NE PASterphus (=Tatuomyia, Zonemyia): NT
 Subgenera:S. (Ceriogaster) Williston, 1888S. (Crepidomyia) Shannon, 1926S. (Mutillimyia) Hull, 1943S. (Sterphus) Philippi, 1865S. (Telus) Thompson, 1973Xylota (=Zelima): AF AU NE OR PA
 Subgenera:X. (Ameroxylota) Hippa, 1978X. (Brachypalpoides) Hippa, 1978X. (Hovaxylota) Keiser, 1971X. (Sterphoides) Hippa, 1978X. (Xylota) Meigen, 1822

Tribe: Rhingiini
(=Cheilosiini Cockerell, 1917)

Subtribe: CheilosiinaCheilosia (=Cartosyrphus, Chilomyia): NE OR PA
 Subgenera:C. (Cheilosia) Meigen, 1822C. (Conicheila) Barkalov, 2002C. (Convocheila) Barkalov, 2002C. (Eucartosyrphus) Barkalov, 2002C. (Floccocheila) Barkalov, 2002C. (Montanocheila) Barkalov, 2002C. (Nephomyia) Matsumura, 1916C. (Pollinocheila) Barkalov, 2002C. (Rubrocheila) Barkalov, 2002Endoiasimyia Bigot, 1882 (=Sonanomyia): OR PAFerdinandea Rondani, 1844: NE OR PAHiatomyia Shannon, 1922: NEPortevinia Goffe, 1944: PATaeniochilosia Oldenberg, 1916: PA

Subtribe: PelecocerinaIschyroptera Pokorny, 1887: PAMacropelecocera Stackelberg, 1952: PAPelecocera (=Euceratomyia): NE PA
 Subgenera:P. (Chamaesyrphus) Mik, 1895P. (Pelecocera) Meigen, 1822Psarochilosia Stackelberg, 1952: PA

Subtribe: PsarinaPsarus Latreille, 1804: PA

Subtribe: RhingiinaRhingia : AF NE NT OR PA
 Subgenera:R. (Eorhingia) Hull, 1949R. (Rhingia) Scopoli, 1763

Tribe: VolucelliniCopestylum (=Camerania, Glaurotricha): AU NE NT
 Subgenera:C. (Apophysophora) Williston, 1888C. (Copestylum) Macquart, 1846C. (Lepidopsis) Curran, 1925C. (Megametopon) Giglio-Tos, 1891C. (Phalacromyia)C. (Tachinosyrphus) Hull, 1936C. (Viereckomyia) Curran, 1925C. (Volosyrpha) Shannon, 1928C. (Volucellosia) Curran, 1930Graptomyza Wiedemann, 1820 (=Baryterocera, Ptilostylomyia): AF AU OR PAOrnidia Lepeletier & Serville, 1828: AF NE NT ORVolucella Geoffroy, 1762 (=Temnocera): NE OR PA

Microdontinae
The arrangement of genera here follows the extensive revision carried out by Reemer & Ståhls (2013).

Tribe: MicrodontiniAfromicrodon Thompson, 2008: AFArchimicrodonSubgenera:A. (Archimicrodon) Hull, 1945: ORA. (Hovamicrodon) Keiser, 1971Aristosyrphus (=Protoceratophya): NT
Subgenera:A. (Aristosyrphus) Curran, 1941A. (Eurypterosyrphus) Barretto & Lane, 1947Bardistopus Mann, 1920: AUCarreramyia Doesburg, 1966: NTCeratophya Wiedemann, 1824: NTCeratrichomyia Séguy, 1951: AFCeriomicrodon Hull, 1937: NTCervicorniphora Hull, 1945: AUChrysidimyia Hull, 1937Domodon Reemer, 2013: NTFurcantenna Cheng, 2008: ORHeliodon Reemer, 2013: ORHypselosyrphus Hull, 1937: NTIndascia Keiser, 1958: ORKryptopyga Hull, 1944Laetodon Reemer, 2013: NTMasarygus Brethes, 1909: NTMenidon Reemer, 2013: NTMermerizon Reemer, 2013: NTMetadon Reemer, 2013: OR AF AUMicrodonSubgenera:M. (Chymophila) Macquart, 1834 (=Eumicrodon): NE NTM. (Dimeraspis) Newman, 1838M. (Megodon) Keiser, 1971M. (Microdon) Meigen, 1803 M. (Myiacerapis) Hull, 1949M. (Syrphipogon) Hull, 1937Mixogaster Macquart, 1842: NE NTNothomicrodon Wheeler, 1924: NTOligeriops Hull, 1937Omegasyrphus Giglio-Tos, 1891: NE NTParagodon Thompson, 1969: NTParamicrodon Meijere, 1913 (=Myxogasteroides, Nannomyrmecomyia, Syrphinella): AU NT ORParamixogaster Brunetti, 1923 (=Paramixogasteroides, Tanaopicera): AU ORParocyptamus Shiraki, 1930Peradon Reemer, 2013: NTPiruwa Reemer, 2013: NTPseudomicrodon Hull, 1937Ptilobactrum Bezzi, 1915Rhoga Walker, 1857 (=Papiliomyia): NTRhopalosyrphus Giglio-Tos, 1891 (=Holmbergia): NTSchizoceratomyia Carrera, Lopes & Lane, 1947 (=Johnsoniodon): NTSerichlamys Curran, 1925: NE NTStipomorpha Hull, 1945: NTSulcodon Reemer, 2013: ORSurimyia Reemer, 2008 : NTThompsodon Reemer, 2013: NTUbristes Walker, 1852 (=Hypselosyrphus, Stipomorpha): NT

Tribe: SpheginobacchiniSpheginobaccha Shiraki, 1930 de Meijere, 1908

Pipizinae
The subfamily Pipizinae was formerly considered a tribe within Eristalinae, but a recent phylogenetic analysis suggests it should be ranked as a separate subfamily (Mengual, 2015).Cryptopipiza Mutin, 1998Heringia (=Cnemodon): NE PA
 Subgenera:H. (Heringia) Rondani, 1856H. (Neocnemodon) Goffe, 1944
†Oligopipiza Nidergas, Hadrava, Nel et al., 2018 (a fossil genus from Middle Oligocene ~28 MYR-BP): PA Pipiza Fallén, 1810 (=Pseudopipiza): NE NT PAPipizella Rondani, 1856: PATrichopsomyia Williston, 1888 (=Halictomyia): NE NT OR PATriglyphus Loew, 1840: AU OR PA

Syrphinae
The subfamily Syrphinae is subdivided into 4 well established tribes. For table of genera, subgenera, authors and types see Mengual et al (2008)</ref>

Tribe: Bacchini
(=Melanostomatini)Argentinomyia Lynch Arribalzaga, 1891 (=Braziliana, Rhysops): NTBaccha Fabricius, 1805: NE OR PALeucopodella Hull, 1949: NE NTMelanostoma Schiner, 1860 (=Plesia): AF AU NE OR PAPlatycheirus (=Stenocheilosia): AU NE NT OR PA
Subgenera:P. (Carposcalis) Enderlein, 1938P. (Eocheilosia) Hull, 1949P. (Pachysphyria) Enderlein, 1938P. (Platycheirus) Lepeletier & Serville, 1828P. (Pseudoplatychirus) Doesburg, 1955Pyrophaena Schiner, 1860Rohdendorfia Smirnov, 1924: PASpazigaster Rondani, 1843: PASyrphocheilosia Stackelberg, 1864: PATalahua Fluke, 1945: NTTuberculanostoma Fluke, 1943: NT PAXanthandrus (=Indosyrphus): cosmopolitan
Subgenera:X. (Afroxanthandrus) Kassebeer, 2000X. (Androsyrphus) Thompson, 1981X. (Xanthandrus) Verrall, 1901

Tribe: ParaginiParagus : AF AU NE OR PA
Subgenera:P. (Afroparagus) Vujić & Radenković, 2008P. (Pandasyopthalmus) Stuckenberg, 1954P. (Paragus) Latreille, 1804P. (Serratoparagus) Vujić & Radenković, 2008

Tribe: Syrphini
(=Chrysotoxini). In Mengual et al. (2008) this tribe was resolved into two groups.

Syrphini (Group 1)Afrosyrphus Curran, 1927: AFBetasyrphus Matsumura, 1917: AF AU OR PAChrysotoxum Meigen, 1803 (=Mulio): AF NE NT OR PADasysyrphus Enderlein, 1938: NE NT OR PADidea Macquart, 1834: NE OR PADideoides Brunetti, 1908 (=Malayomyia): OR PADideopsis Matsumura, 1917: AU OR PAEpistrophe Walker, 1852 (=Eristalosyrphus): AU NE OR PAEpistrophella (Dusek & Laska 1967)Eriozona Schiner, 1860: NE OR PAEupeodes : cosmopolitan
Subgenera:E. (Eupeodes) Osten Sacken, 1877E. (Macrosyrphus) Matsumura, 1917E. (Metasyrphus) Matsumura, 1917Fagisyrphus Dusek & Laska, 1967Flavizona Huo, 2010Ischiodon Sack, 1913: AF AU OR PALapposyrphus Dusek & Laska, 1967Leucozona : NE OR PA
Subgenera:L. (Ischyrosyrphus) Bigot, 1882L. (Leucozona) Schiner, 1860Megasyrphus Dusek & Laska 1967Melangyna (=Mesosyrphus, Stenosyrphus) : AU NE OR PA
Subgenera:M. (Austrosyrphus) Vockeroth, 1969M. (Melangyna) Verrall, 1901M. (Melanosyrphus) Vockeroth, 1969Meligramma Frey, 1946Notosyrphus Vockeroth, 1969 : NTParasyrphus Matsumura, 1917: NE OR PAPhilhelius Stephens, 1841 (=Xanthogramma): NE OR PAPseudodoros : AF NE NT PA
Subgenera:P. (Dioprosopa) Hull, 1949P. (Pseudodoros) Matsumura, 1903Scaeva (=Catabomba): NE NT OR PA
Subgenera:S. (Scaeva) Fabricius, 1805S. (Semiscaeva) Kuznetsov, 1985Simosyrphus Bigot, 1882: AUSyrphus Fabricius, 1775 : AF NE NT OR PA

Syrphini (Group 2)Anu Thompson, 2008Allobacha Curran, 1928 (=Ptileuria): AF AU OR PAAllograpta (=Miogramma, Oligorhina): cosmopolitan
Subgenera:A. (Allograpta) Osten Sacken, 1875A. (Antillus) Vockeroth, 1969A. (Claraplumula) Shannon, 1927A. (Costarica) Mengual & Thompson, 2009A. (Rhinoprosopa) Hull, 1942Anu Thompson, 2008: AUAsarkina : AF AU OR PA
Subgenera:A. (Achoanus) Munro, 1924A. (Asarkina) Macquart, 1834Citrogramma Vockeroth, 1969: AU OREosalpingogaster Hull, 1949bEosphaerophoria Frey, 1946 (=Tambavanna): AU OR  Episyrphus : AF AU OR PA
Subgenera:E. (Asiobaccha) Violovitch, 1976E. (Episyrphus) Matsumura & Adachi, 1917Fazia Shannon, 1927Giluwea Vockeroth, 1969: AUMeliscaeva Frey, 1946 : NE OR PAOcyptamus : NE NT
Subgenera:O. (Atylobaccha) Hull, 1949O. (Aulacibaccha) Hull, 1949O. (Calostigma) Shannon, 1927O. (Hermesomyia) Vockeroth, 1969O. (Hybobathus) Enderlein, 1937O. (Mimocalla) Hull, 1943O. (Ocyptamus) Macquart, 1834O. (Orphnabaccha) Hull, 1949O. (Pelecinobaccha) Shannon, 1927O. (Pipunculosyrphus) Hull, 1937O. (Pseudoscaeva) Vockeroth, 1969O. (Styxia) Hull, 1943O. (Therantha) Hull, 1943Salpingogaster Schiner, 1868: NE NTSphaerophoria : AF AU NE OR PA
Subgenera:S. (Exallandra) Vockeroth, 1969: AFS. (Loveridgeana) van Doesburg & van Doesburg, 1976S. (Sphaerophoria) Lepeletier & Serville, 1828Victoriana Miranda, 2020: AU

Syrphini (Group undetermined)Agnisyrphus Ghorpade, 1994: ORAsiodidea Stackelberg, 1930: PADideomima Vockeroth, 1969: NE NTDoros Meigen, 1803: NE PALamellidorsum Huo & Zheng, 2005: PAPelloloma Vockeroth, 1973: AFRhinobaccha Meijere, 1908: ORVockerothiella Ghorpade, 1994 : OR

Tribe: ToxomeriniToxomerus Macquart, 1855 (=Antiops, Mesogramma, Mesograpta, Mitrosphen): AU NE NT

Genera of uncertain affinities
This section contains a list of genera for which the bibliography does not provide a clear systematic position.  These genera are not intended as incertae sedis: It is likely that they have been given a formal taxonomic description or been defined in a subsequent revision, but not in the works consulted. Pia Philippi, 1865: NTPoliomyia Scudder, 1878: NESpheginascia Meunier, 1901: PA

See also

 Syrphidae of New York State
List of flower fly species of North America

Notes

References

Bibliography
BioSystematic Database of World Diptera  
Libor Mazánek. Syrphidae Latreille, 1802. In L. Jedlička, V. Stloukalová, M. Kúdela (editor), Checklist of Diptera of the Czech Republic and Slovakia. Electronic version 1 + CD-ROM, 2006. .

Sabrosky, C. W. Family-Group Names in Diptera. An annotated catalog. In F. Christian Thompson (editor), MYIA The International Journal of the North America Dipertists' Society. Volume 10. Leiden, Backhuys Publishers, 1999.
Thompson, F. C., & Rotheray, G. Family Syrphidae. In: László Papp, Béla Darvas (editor) Manual of Palaearctic Diptera. Volume 3: Higher Brachycera. Budapest, Science Herald, 1998: 81-139 . 

Vockeroth, J. R. & Thompson, F. C. Syrphidae. In: Jeffrey F. McAlpine (editor) Manual of Nearctic Diptera'', Volume 2. Research Branch, Agriculture Canada, Monograph 28, 1987: 713-743. .

L
Syrphidae